TRACY 168 (born Michael Tracy in 1958) is an American graffiti artist. He pioneered the art form known as Wildstyle. Tracy 168 came to be known as one of the most influential graffiti and street artists of all time, as variations of Wild Style writing spread around the world. He is acknowledged to have been a seminal figure in the development of street art. Books about 1970s graffiti feature his car-long paintings with their characteristic kinetic script embellished with flames, arrows as well as cartoon characters and the "Tracy face," a grinning shaggy-haired visage in wrap-around shades.

Early life
Tracy grew up in the Bronx. He attended the High School of Art and Design.

TRACY 168 was an honorary member of the Black Spades. He formed his own group called The Wanted in the 1970s. The Wanted headquarters were in the basement of a building at 166th Street and Woody-crest Avenue in The Bronx.

Career 
He is featured extensively in the documentary Just to Get a Rep. He discusses WiLD STYLE and the troubled relationship between graffiti and the established art world. In July 2006, a 1984 work by Tracy covered a subway car door. The work was shown at the Brooklyn Museum of Art during its month-long exhibit, "Graffiti". Tracy was the mentor to many graffitists; Keith Haring and SAMO among them. Despite appearing in major gallery and museum shows, Tracy maintained a solid street presence with his STREET MURALS in Brooklyn and the Bronx, where he currently resides. Tracy 168 is famous for his tags of a drawing called Purple Haze which relates and serves as a tribute to Jimi Hendrix.  The artwork was part of the Experience Music Project.

References

External links
 Short biography of the artist
 Site featuring the artists work and bio

1958 births
Living people
American graffiti artists